Harishchandra Fort is a hill fort in the Ahmednagar district of India. Its history is linked with that of Malshej Ghat, kothale village and it has played a major role in guarding and controlling the
surrounding region.

History
The fort is quite ancient. Remnants of Microlithic man have been discovered here. The various Puranas (ancient scriptures) like Matsyapurana, Agnipurana and Skandapurana include many references about Harishchandragad. Its origin is said to have been in the 6th century, during the rule of Kalachuri dynasty. The citadel was built during this era. The various caves probably have been carved out in the 11th century. In these caves are idols of Lord Vishnu. Though the cliffs are named Taramati and Rohidas, they are not related to Ayodhya. Great sage Changdev (one who created the epic Tatvasaar), used to meditate here in the 14th century. The caves are from the same period. The various constructions on the fort and those existing the surrounding region point to the existence of diverse cultures here. The carvings on the temples of Nageshwar (in Khireshwar village), in the Harishchandreshwar temple and in the cave of Kedareshwar indicate that the fort belongs to the medieval period, since it is related to mahadeva as a totem of tribes Mahadev Koli. They were controlling the fort before Moguls.
Later the fort was under the control of Moguls. The Marathas captured it in 1747.

Notable Places of Interest

Saptatirtha Pushkarni
To the east of the temple is a well-built lake called “Saptatirtha”. On its bank are temple-like constructions in which there are idols of Lord Vishnu. Recently these idols have been shifted in the caves near the temple of Harishchandreshwar. These days many trekkers have been responsible for the sad plight of this place, as they throw plastic wastes and other things in the pond. 7 years back the water was potable, and now it isn't suitable even to swim. (However, this water is so cold in summer that you can actually feel like you are standing in a refrigeration unit.)

Kedareshwar Cave
Towards the right of Harishchandreshwar temple, there is the huge cave of Kedareshwar (see picture), in which there is a big Shiva Linga, which is completely surrounded by water. Its height from the base is five feet, and the water is waist-deep. It is quite difficult to reach the Shiva Linga because the water is ice-cold. There are sculptures carved out in the cave. In the monsoon it is not possible to reach this cave, as a huge stream flows across the way. Actually this is the origin of River Mangalganga.

As can be seen from the picture, there is a huge rock above the Shiva Linga. There were four pillars built around the Shiva Linga to support the cave.

Another interesting thing about this place is that water seeps into this temple from the four walls on an everyday basis. And owing to the water being very cold, it's difficult to reach inside too. The water continues to seep in during all the seasons during the year. During rainy season the water level in this cave becomes almost waist high.

Kokan Kada (कोकण कडा)

This cliff faces west and looks down upon the Konkan. It provides views of the surrounding region. The cliff has an overhang, but has been climbed many times. Sometimes a circular rainbow (the Brocken spectre phenomenon) can be seen from this point. It can be seen only when there is a bit of mist in the valley, and the sun is right behind the person facing the valley. If you happen to visit this place in April-May, then throw your panama cap from the cliff and enjoy it rising high and falling back on the plateau.

Taramati peak
Also known as Taramanchi. This is the top most point on the fort (1429 meters). Leopards are seen in the forests beyond this peak. From here we can have a glimpse of the whole range of Naneghat and the forts near Murbad.
From this Taramati point, we can have a glimpse of forts till Siddhagad near Bhimashankar in the south and Napta twin peaks, Ghodishep (865 meters), Ajoba (1375 meters), Kulang fort (1471 meters) in the north near the Kasara region.

Caves on Harishchandragad
These caves are spread out all over the fort. Many of these are situated at the foot of Taramati peak and are the place of accommodation. A few are near the temple, whereas some are near the citadel and some far away in the forests. Many other caves are still said to remain undiscovered.

Nageshwar temple near Khireshwar
This is a great antique construction, and diverse artistic works are seen on this. On the ceiling of the temple are carvings. The main attraction of the carvings here is the 1.5 m long sculpture of Lord Vishnu in the sleeping posture, popularly known as "Sheshshayi Vishnu" in Marathi. It is rare and hence holds a lot of importance. There are a lot of legends told about this sculpture. There are caves near the temple.

Temple of Harishchandreshwar

This temple is marvelous example of the fine art of carving sculptures out of stones that prevailed in ancient India. It is about 16 m high from its base. Around this temple there a few caves & ancient water tanks. The river Mangal Ganga is said to originate from one of the tanks located close to the temple. The top of the temple resembles construction with the north-Indian temples. A similar temple is situated in Buddha-Gaya. Here we can see many tombs, in which a typical construction is seen. These are built by well-finished arranging stones one on top of the other. There are three main caves near the temple. The cisterns near the temple provide drinking water. A short distance away, another temple called Kashitirtha is located. The fascinating thing about this temple is that it has been carved out from a single huge rock. There are entrances from all four sides. On the main entrance there are sculptures of faces. These are faces of guards of the temple. On the left side of the entrance is a Devsnagsri inscription, which is about saint Changdev.

How to reach
Harishchandragad lies where the boundaries of Thane, Pune and Ahmednagar districts converge.

1) From Thane District:
One has to board the bus for Nagar from Kalyan & alight at ‘Khubi Phata’. From there we reach the village of Khireshwar by bus or private vehicle. This village is 7 km from the foothills of the fort.

2) From Pune District:
There is a daily bus from Shivajinagar ST stand (Pune) to Khireswar village.

3) From Ahmednagar District:
One has to board the bus for Nashik or Mumbai & alight at Ghoti village. From Ghoti, we have to board another bus to Sangamner via Malegaon & alight at Rajur village. From here, 2 ways diverge to the fort.
1) From Rajur, one has to board the bus or a private vehicle to the village of Pachanai. From here, the way is straight to the topmost point.
2) Recently, the way from Rajur to kothale (Tolar Khind) has been made available. From Tolar Khind (Tolar valley), the temple is about 2–3 hours by walking.
3) from kotul to kothale bus facilities available way to tolar khind every hour bus going towards kothale, private vehicles also available on this route.

Hiking to the Fort
There are 4–5 known ways up to the fort, the most usual being the following ones:

Way from Khireshwar
The way beside the caves, where water tanks are seen, proceeds further to Junnar Darwaaja (entrance From Junnar). From here, the route goes straight to Tolar Khind. Walking a few minutes from Tolar Khind, we come across a rock-patch on which railings are fixed. After ascending the railings, we come to the plateau region on which less dense forests are seen. From here, we have to cross 7 hills and after a walk of 2–3 hours, we reach the temple of Harishchandreshwar, the temple of Lord Shiva.

Also there is one interesting short route if one has to skip the seven hills. By this route, you can reach the temple in 1 hour instead of 2 hours through seven hills but this route goes through very very dense forests hence if you are in group of many people, this route can be tried. After climbing the rock patch from the Tolar Khind, follow the usual trek route going ahead and at one point, you will encounter two ways one to the right goes to the temple through seven hills and the straight one goes below the Balekilla (citadel) through very dense forests and this route reaches to the seventh mountain directly.

Way from Belpada
The third way is specially meant for hikers, which is via Sadhleghat. One should board the bus for Malshej Ghat and go to the village of Belpada via Savarne village on the Malshej-Kalyan road. From here, the route goes through Sadhleghat. Here one has to climb a straight rock patch on which grips are provided. The temple is situated at a height of about 1 km from Belpada. The total distance is about 19 km. This route is not very popular and less used. Trekkers are advised to take guide and very slippery in rainy season.

Way from Pachnai 

There is another way to reach Harischandragad is from Pachnai village, a village you can reach by buses or private vehicles. Buses coming from Rajur, Akole or from Kotul. From Kotul the distance is 25 km with buses going every hour towards Pachnai & Kothale. From kothale pachnai is 5 km away, you can reach there by local transport. Harischandragad is 3 km away from Pachnai. To reach Harischandragad you need to go by foot. On this way there is a small pond of pure natural water available at that pond. The history of that pond is that some years ago this pond provided water for all cowboys who came from the nearest villages. Pachnai is surrounded by mountain and in monsoon you can get visual of five falls from base.

Drinking water
The water tanks near the caves provide water all round the year for basic needs. The perennial stream running near the caves is the major source for drinking water. It is advisable to refrain from drinking water at the tank near to caves. While in monsoon, there are a number of waterfalls around the caves which provide potable water. Potable water is available from the tanks which are present in the temple compound.

On weekends during summer and winter, the villagers sell lemon water and buttermilk at 2–3 points between Tolar Khind and Harishchandreshwar. Basic meals are available at 7–8 temporary shacks over the weekend. Even tents can be provided by local people for accommodation.

Notes
In monsoon, proper care should be taken while trekking in the rockface after Tolar khind. It is advisable not to walk on the rock face in monsoon particularly during night where one can experience heavy rainfall with thunder strikes.

ST bus timings from Pune for trekkers
Take a 4:30 am ST bus from Shivajinagar to Kalwan via Nasik
Get down at Ale-Phata around 6:30 am
Take another bus going to Kalyan from Ale-Phata. You will have 2 to 3 buses around 7:00 am
Reach Khubi-Phata village around 7:45 am and start walking towards Khireshwar along Pimpalgaon Joge dam. You will reach Khireshwar, the base village in 1 hour
While coming to Pune, around evening, there are many buses available around 5:30 pm from the Khubi Phata village on Malshej road.

See also

 List of forts in Maharashtra

References

External links 
 Harishchandragad Information website
 Junnar Tourism's Official Website 
 Parashar Agritourism Website

Forts in Maharashtra
Tourist attractions in Ahmednagar district
Forts in Ahmednagar district